Ondrej Vendolsky (born ) is a Czech male track cyclist. He competed in the individual and team pursuit event at the 2013 UCI Track Cycling World Championships.

References

External links
 Profile at cyclingarchives.com

1991 births
Living people
Czech track cyclists
Czech male cyclists
Place of birth missing (living people)